Pat Sheahan may refer to:

 Pat Sheahan (Canadian football coach), Canadian football coach
 Pat Sheahan (publican), New Zealand rugby union player, publican and publisher